SREDIM is a method of task analysis. It is an acronym derived from the words select, record, examine, develop, install/implement and maintain. This problem solving method's analysis system can be used to analyze any process to determine parts of the process which are inefficient, or can be improved.

Select
Choose the parts of the process to study, identifying bottlenecks, and data to collect etc.
The "bottleneck" is not necessarily just a pinch point in the work flow typically found in production processes. It can also be identified as any task or part of the process that falls below the anticipated or predetermined standard.

Therefore, we must also consider, poor quality, imbalance in work content between processes (typical on textile production lines), lack of raw material supply, machine malfunction, lack of meaningful standard operating procedures or adequate training.

We need to consider all of the above in the "selection" process, i.e. something that is affecting the normal function of the system or task under review.

Record
This part of the process is based around taking details of the different parts of the process which is to be studied, as defined in part 1. Record the facts and differentiate between facts, assumptions, and opinions.

Examine
Analyse the data that you have collected and apply another acronym to it, PPSPM:

Develop
When you have identified the problems and issues, this is the stage to create a new method or process based on data collected. Develop an alternative solution.

Install or Implement
The new method which has been put together must be costed and installed for it to work

Maintain
While it takes a lot of effort to create a new method, for it to continue working, processes must be put in place to ensure that the system continues working.

Sources

 

Business process management